Legislative Assembly elections were held in Punjab on 20 February 2022 to elect the 117 members of the 16th Assembly of the Punjab Legislative Assembly. The votes were counted and the results were declared on 10 March 2022.

The Aam Aadmi Party gained a strong 79% majority in the sixteenth Punjab Legislative Assembly by winning 92 out of 117 seats. AAP Punjab convener and MP Bhagwant Mann was sworn in as Chief Minister on 16 March 2022. Mann ministry was formed with 10 cabinet ministers on 19 March 2022.

Background and overview
The tenure of the Punjab Legislative Assembly was scheduled to end on 23 March 2022. The previous assembly elections were held in February 2017. After the election, Indian National Congress formed the state government, with Amarinder Singh becoming Chief Minister.

Political Developments 

On 18 September 2021, Chief Minister Captain Amarinder Singh resigned over differences with other members of Congress and was succeeded by Charanjit Singh Channi. On 27 October 2021, Singh announced he would be forming a new party to contest the election. He officially resigned from Indian National Congress on 2 November 2021, and founded a new political party, Punjab Lok Congress.

Between June and November 2021, five AAP MLAs joined Congress.

In the 2021 Chandigarh Municipal Corporation election that occurred in December 2021, the Aam Aadmi Party won 14 seats and became the single largest party in the council of total 35 seats.

As of January 2022, four Congress MLAs joined BJP, one of which returned.

On 18 January 2022, AAP declared Bhagwant Mann as their Chief Ministerial candidate for the assembly election.

On 6 February, Congress leader Rahul Gandhi announced incumbent Chief Minister Charanjit Singh Channi as their Chief Ministerial candidate.

Farmers Protests 

The Parliament of India passed 3 agricultural farm laws in Lok Sabha on 17 September 2020 and in the Rajya Sabha on 20 September 2020. The President of India, Ram Nath Kovind, gave his assent on 27 September 2020. Farmers and farmers unions held massive protests over a period of more than a year mainly in Punjab, Haryana, Delhi and Uttar Pradesh. On 19 November 2021, the union government decided to repeal the bills.

Election schedule 
The election schedule was announced by the Election Commission of India on 8 January 2022. However,  the election date was postponed from 14 February 2022 to 20 February 2022 on account of Guru Ravidass Jayanti.

{| class="wikitable"
!S.No. 
!Event
!Date
!Day
|-
!1.
|Date for Nominations
|25 January 2022
|Tuesday
|-
!2.
|Last Date for filing Nominations
|1 February 2022
|Tuesday
|-
!3.
|Date for scrutiny of nominations
|2 February  2022
|Wednesday
|-
!4.
|Last date for withdrawal of candidatures
|4 February 2022
|Friday
|-
!5.
|Date of poll
|20 February 2022
|Sunday
|-
!6.|Date of counting
|10 March 2022
|Thursday
|-
!6
|Date before which election shall be completed 
|12 March 2022
|Saturday
|}

Voter statistics
According to Punjab Election Commission, 1,304 candidates contested the election and there were 21,499,804 registered voters in the state.

Parties and alliances

SAD dissolved its alliance with the BJP, which had lasted over two decades, over the controversial Farm Bills passed by the BJP-controlled Indian Parliament in 2020. On 13 June 2021, SAD and BSP announced an alliance for the assembly election with 97-20 seat sharing. On 28 December 2021, BJP, PLC and SAD(S) announced an alliance for the assembly elections.

AAP contested on all the seats without any alliance.

  
Chief Ministerial candidate was Charanjit Singh Channi.

  
Chief Ministerial candidate was Bhagwant Mann.

  
Chief Ministerial candidate was Sukhbir Singh Badal.

  
NDA contested the election without a Chief Ministerial face.

PLC was allotted 37 seats, but only contested in 34 seats after it could not find candidates to run in 3 seats. The three seats were returned to BJP. 4 Candidates of PLC contested on BJP symbol.

  
Chief Ministerial candidate was Balbir Singh Rajewal.

 Others 

 Candidates 

AAP CM candidate Bhagwant Mann contested from Dhuri.

Congress leader and CM Charanjit Singh Channi contested from Chamkaur Sahib and Bhadaur, and  former CM Rajinder Kaur Bhattal contested from Lehragaga from INC.

Former CM, Prakash Singh Badal, member of Shiromani Akali Dal, contested from Lambi. While SAD-BSP alliance’s CM candidate Sukhbir Singh Badal contested from Jalalabad. Former CM, Amarinder Singh, member of Punjab Lok Congress (PLC) contested from Patiala Urban.

There were total 1304 candidates in fray. 2266 candidates filed their nominations and out of these, 1645 found valid. 341 withdrew  their candidature.
 (Names of the winning candidates are in bold text)

Campaigns
Samyukt Kisan Morcha (SKM), the umbrella body of farmers, campaigned against the ruling BJP by organizing public meetings and rallies asking farmers to not vote for BJP. SKM had organised the 2020–2021 Indian farmers' protest against the controversial three farm acts which were passed by the BJP-led Union Government in the BJP controlled Parliament of India in September 2020. These laws were eventually withdrawn by the Union government.

On 31 January 2022, the farmer leaders observed "Vishwasghat Diwas" (treachery day) across India after the Union government failed to fulfill promises that were made to the farmers during the withdrawal of agitation against three farm laws. SKM leaders have warned that the farm laws may be re-introduced if BJP wins the elections.

 Policy positions 
Farm Laws
BJP's Union Agriculture Minister Narendra Singh Tomar in December 2021, had said that BJP brought the 3 agriculture amendment laws (repealed in 2021). "But the government is not disappointed. We moved a step back and we will move forward again because farmers are India’s backbone."

The AAP is against the farm laws and had supported the farmers' unions during their year-long protest against the farm laws.

Campaigning

 Indian National Congress 
Congress party started their campaign from Atamnagar, Ludhiana with CM Charanjit Singh Channi and Punjab Pradesh Congress Committee president Navjot Singh Sidhu.

Shiromani Akali Dal

In March 2021, Shiromani Akali Dal began holding rallies and protests under slogan "Punjab Mangda Jawaab" led by party president Sukhbir Singh Badal that criticized Amarinder Singh over issues including a power tariff hike, the value-added tax (VAT) on fuel and his loan waiver promise.

Aam Aadmi Party

In March 2021, Delhi CM Arvind Kejriwal held a Kisaan Mahapanchayat at Bagha Purana in Moga district and began campaigning for elections. On 28 June 2021, Kejriwal announced in a speech in Chandigarh that 300 units of free electricity would be provided to all Punjabis if the party wins the election. On 30 September 2021, Kejriwal also announced that if AAP wins the election, his government would build Mohalla Clinics in Punjab that would provide free healthcare facilities. On 22 November 2021, Arvind Kejriwal announced that if AAP wins Punjab then 1,000 rupees will be given to every women above 18 years of age.

On 9 February, Aam Aadmi Party’s chief ministerial candidate and MP, Bhagwant Mann raised issues about farmers in the Lok Sabha. The payment to sugarcane farmers for the year 2020-21 and 2021-22 had been pending. He appealed for clearing the due early along with interest.  He asked for compensation for the losses in cotton farmers due to the pest attack. he asked that the Union government should recognize the farmers who died during the 2020–2021 Indian farmers' protest.

Anmol Gagan Maan sang the campaign song for AAP, "Bhagat Singh, Kartar Sarabha saare hi ban challe, bhai hun jaago aaiyaan, sarkaar badlan challey, bhai hun jaago aaiyaan". Indian Express'' called the song a "huge hit during campaigning".

Bahujan Samaj Party 
On 31 December 2020, Bahujan Samaj Party cadres, led by state president Jasbir Singh Garhi, first gathered at Shambhu border and then left in a cavalcade of 100 cars to join the protest and show solidarity to the farmers. They also waved banners in support of farmers and on unity of farmers and labourers, as most number of labourers come from the Scheduled Castes. It was the first time that a political party was part of the farmers protest in such large numbers.

Garhi has also criticized what he argues are lies and corruption of the incumbent government on the subject of the implementation of Post Metric Scholarship Scheme, calling it the "Scholarship Scheme Scam".

Bharatiya Janata Party 
After two years, In election year Modi came to Punjab for a public rally after repealing controversial Farm Laws for NDA. However, rally was cancelled due to farmers protest at Ferozpur–Moga road.

Campaign controversies

Election Commission of India 
On 8 January 2022, Election Commission of India announced ban on physical rallies until 15 January, due to high positivity rate of COVID-19. ECI further extended the ban until 22 January. The ban was further extended to 31 January 2022.

INC
Manish Tewari, the only MP from Congress in Punjab was not included in the list of start campaigners. Senior leader Ghulam Nabi Azad was also left out. The two leaders had written to Congress president asking for reforms in Congress party. Sunil Jakhar claimed he wasn't made Chief Minister despite having the support of the most 42 MLAs, and quit from active politics few days later.

Campaign finance 
ECI increased the expenditure limit to ₹40 lakh.

Dynasty politics

Shiromani Akali Dal 

 Former Deputy CM Sukhbir Singh Badal, Son of Former CM Parkash Singh Badal is contesting from Jalalabad.
Former Punjab Minister Tota Singh is contesting from Dharamkot and his son Barjinder Singh Makhan Brar is contesting from Moga.
 Former Anandpur Sahib Lok Sabha MP Prem Singh Chandumajra is contesting from Ghanaur and his son Harinderpal Singh Chandumajra (incumbent MLA) is contesting from Sanour.

Indian National Congress
Congress has decided to follow 'one family, one ticket' norm while selecting party candidates for the upcoming assembly elections in Punjab.

 Manish Bansal, son of Pawan Kumar Bansal, former Minister of Railways is contesting from Barnala.
 Smit Singh, nephew of Navjot Singh Sidhu is contesting from Amargarh.
 Vikram Bajwa, son-in-law of Rajinder Kaur Bhattal is contesting from Sahnewal.

Poll predictions

Opinion polls

Exit polls 
The Election Commission banned the media from publishing exit polls between 7 AM on 10 February 2022 and 6:30 PM on 7 March 2022. Violation of the directive would be punishable with two years of imprisonment. Accordingly the exit polls below were published in the evening of 7 March.

Incidents

Voting Machine malfunction
Electronic Voter Machine (EVM) malfunction was reported at several places. AAP reported these incidents to the Election Commission.

Voter turnout 
Source:

Results

Results by alliance and party

Results by region

Results by division

Results by district

Results by constituency

Government formation

See also

 2022 elections in India
 Politics of Punjab
 List of incumbent MPs from Punjab
 2019 Indian general election in Punjab
 2024 Indian general election in Punjab

Notes

References

2022 State Assembly elections in India
State Assembly elections in Punjab, India
2020s in Punjab, India